The London Borough of Barnet is a London borough in North London and forms part of Outer London. It borders Hertfordshire to the north and five other London boroughs: Harrow and Brent to the west, Camden and Haringey to the south-east and Enfield to the east.

Postcode areas in Barnet are EN, HA, N, and NW.

Neighbourhoods

Electoral wards
Brunswick Park, Burnt Oak, Childs Hill, Colindale, Coppetts, East Barnet, East Finchley, Edgware, Finchley Church End, Garden Suburb, Golders Green, Hale, Hendon, High Barnet, Mill Hill, Oakleigh, Totteridge, Underhill, West Finchley, West Hendon, Woodhouse.

References

 
Lists of places in London